Punta San Carlos Airstrip is a public dirt airstrip located in Punta San Carlos, Municipality of Ensenada, Baja California, Mexico, a little camp located on the Pacific Ocean coast, 50 miles South of El Rosario de Arriba. The airstrip is used solely for general aviation  purposes. The PSK code is used as identifier.

External links
Punta San Carlos Info
Baja Bush Pilots forum about PSK.

Airports in Baja California